The Matagorda Island Light is located on Matagorda Island in Calhoun County, in the U.S. state of Texas. Once under the jurisdiction of the United States Coast Guard, the lighthouse is now managed by the Texas Parks and Wildlife Department.

History
Building of a lighthouse to guide sea-going vessels into Matagorda Bay through Pass Cavallo was authorized by the Congress of the Republic of Texas in 1845 . When President James K. Polk signed the Texas Annexation documents on December 29, 1845, it became the responsibility of the United States. In 1847, the United States Congress authorized $15,090 to build the lighthouse. Legislative red tape caused a series of delays, and the contract to build the lighthouse was finally awarded to Murray and Hazlehurst of Baltimore in 1851. The new  cast iron lighthouse became functional on December 21, 1852. Gulf storms and subsequent beach erosion caused the lighthouse to be rebuilt on higher ground. The light tower was raised  in 1857 to enable the beam to be seen from a greater distance. A new lens was installed in 1859.

During the Civil War, the Confederate States Navy tried to blow up the lighthouse to keep it out of Union hands. Damage inflicted by the Confederate troops necessitated rebuilding of the lighthouse at a new site in 1873 at a cost of $32,000.

The 1886 Indianola hurricane destroyed most of the town, and caused the water to rise  inside the tower. The resulting structural swaying caused the lens to fall out.  In 1956, the tower was automated by the United States Coast Guard, making it the first time the tower was not operated by human keepers.

Renovation
The Texas Parks and Wildlife Department, which manages the lighthouse, installed a new rotating solar-powered marine lantern in 1999. After having been out of commission since 1995, the light was re-lit at Midnight as the year turned over to 2000, to celebrate the new millennium. The lighthouse underwent a renovation completed in 2004, at a cost of $1.23 million. The renovation was made possible through private donations through the Matagorda Island Foundation, and with a grant from the United States government.

Cemetery
The resting place for lighthouse keepers and their families can be found near the lighthouse.

See also

List of lighthouses in Texas
National Register of Historic Places listings in Calhoun County, Texas

Further reading

References

Lighthouses completed in 1873
Lighthouses on the National Register of Historic Places in Texas
Buildings and structures in Calhoun County, Texas
1852 establishments in Texas
National Register of Historic Places in Calhoun County, Texas